Kingswood may refer to:

Places

Australia
Kingswood, New South Wales
Kingswood (Tamworth), New South Wales
Kingswood Park, New South Wales
Kingswood, South Australia

Canada
Kingswood Music Theatre
Kingswood Drive Public School, an elementary school located in Brampton, Ontario
Kingswood Elementary School (British Columbia), an elementary school in Richmond
Kingswood Elementary School (Nova Scotia), an elementary school in Hammonds Plains
Kingswood University  (New Brunswick), a private Christian university in Sussex

England and Wales
Kingswood, Buckinghamshire
Kingswood, Cheshire, a location in the United Kingdom
Kingswood, Dulwich, South London
Kingswood, Essex, a location in the United Kingdom
Kingswood, Herefordshire
Kingswood, Hertfordshire, a location in the United Kingdom
Kingswood, Kent
Kingswood, Kingston upon Hull, a housing estate
Kingswood, Powys, a location in the United Kingdom
Kingswood, Somerset
Kingswood, South Gloucestershire, on the outskirts of Bristol
Kingswood (UK Parliament constituency)
Kingswood Borough, a former borough
Kingswood, Stroud District, Gloucestershire
Kingswood Abbey
Kingswood, Surrey
Kingswood, Warwickshire

Ireland
Kingswood, Dublin, a suburb
Kingswood Luas stop, a tram stop

United States
Kingswood, Kentucky

Motor vehicles
Chevrolet Kingswood, a station-wagon automobile manufactured from 1959 to 1972
Chevrolet Kingswood Estate, a premium variation of the Chevrolet Kingswood, manufactured from 1969 to 1972 
Holden Kingswood, an automobile manufactured in various forms from 1968 to 1984

Media and entertainment
Kingswood Country, an Australian sitcom, screening from 1980 to 1984
Kingswood, song by The Vasco Era
Kingswood (band), an Australian indie rock band

See also
King's Wood (disambiguation)
Kingwood (disambiguation)
Kingswood Academy (disambiguation)
Kingswood College (disambiguation)
Kingswood School (disambiguation)